The men's rings competition was one of eight events for male competitors in artistic gymnastics at the 1976 Summer Olympics in Montreal. The qualification and final rounds took place on July 18, 20, and 23rd at the Montreal Forum. There were 90 competitors from 20 nations, with nations competing in the team event having 6 gymnasts while other nations could have up to 3 gymnasts. The event was won by Nikolai Andrianov of the Soviet Union, the nation's first victory in the rings since 1960 (and fourth overall). Another Soviet gymnast, Alexander Dityatin, took silver. The Soviet podium streak in the event reached seven Games. Dan Grecu earned Romania's first medal in the rings (and in any men's gymnastic event). Japan's three-Games gold medal streak and five-Games podium streak in the event ended as the nation's best results were fifth and sixth places.

Background

This was the 14th appearance of the event, which is one of the five apparatus events held every time there were apparatus events at the Summer Olympics (no apparatus events were held in 1900, 1908, 1912, or 1920). Three of the four Japanese finalists from 1972 returned: bronze medalist Mitsuo Tsukahara (also a finalist in 1968), fourth-place finisher Sawao Kato (the bronze medalist in 1968), and fifth-place finisher Eizo Kenmotsu. Two-time champion Akinori Nakayama had retired. The reigning world co-champions were Dănuț Grecu of Romania and Nikolai Andrianov of the Soviet Union.

Israel made its debut in the men's rings. The United States made its 13th appearance, most of any nation, having missed only the inaugural 1896 Games.

Competition format

Each nation entered a team of six gymnasts or up to three individual gymnasts. All entrants in the gymnastics competitions performed both a compulsory exercise and a voluntary exercise for each apparatus. The scores for all 12 exercises were summed to give an individual all-around score. These exercise scores were also used for qualification for the apparatus finals. The two exercises (compulsory and voluntary) for each apparatus were summed to give an apparatus score. The top 6 in each apparatus participated in the finals, except that nations were limited to two finalists each; others were ranked 7th through 90th. Half of the preliminary score carried over to the final.

Schedule

All times are Eastern Daylight Time (UTC-4)

Results

Ninety gymnasts competed in the compulsory and optional rounds on July 18 and 20. The six highest scoring gymnasts advanced to the final on July 23. Each country was limited to two competitors in the final. Half of the points earned by each gymnast during both the compulsory and optional rounds carried over to the final. This constitutes the "prelim" score.

References

Official Olympic Report
www.gymnasticsresults.com
www.gymn-forum.net

Men's rings
Men's 1976
Men's events at the 1976 Summer Olympics